The 2002/03 FIS Ski Jumping Continental Cup was the 12th in a row (10th official) Continental Cup winter season and the 1st summer season in ski jumping for men.

Other competitive circuits this season included the World Cup and Grand Prix.

Calendar

Men's summer

Men's winter

Men's team summer

Standings

Summer

Winter

Europa Cup vs. Continental Cup 
This was originally last Europa Cup season and is also recognized as the first Continental Cup season by International Ski Federation although under this name began its first official season in 1993/94.

References

FIS Ski Jumping Continental Cup
2002 in ski jumping
2003 in ski jumping